Mike Rubendall is a tattoo artist based primarily in Massapequa, New York, but also in New York City. His resident studio at the Bowery, Kings Avenue, was ranked top-5 in New York City by Inked in 2015, while Huffington Post named him in 2014 as an artist to follow on Instagram and New York (magazine) named him one of the top "city inkers". He has been featured on VICE as part of Tattoo Age, seasons 2 and 5 of the Ink Master, Tattoo Wars, Prick, was guest editor for Inked, and also featured as part of the Inked spread for Garage Magazine, together with Jeff Koons and Damien Hirst.

Rubendall was born and raised in Massapequa, graduating from Plainedge High School in 1995.

Mike Rubendall learnt tattooing from Frank Romano aged 17. In November 2005, he opened Kings Avenue, which now employs several regular tattooers. After opening, he has tattooed several personalities, including Evan Rachel Wood and Dame Dash.

Rubendall specialises in Japanese, Black and Gray Religious. He has a wait list of approximately a year.

References

External links

Inked Profile
Cleopatra Ink
Webstagram Profile

American tattoo artists
Living people
Year of birth missing (living people)